Samuel Thomas O'Connor (born 5 August 1991) is an Australian politician. He has been the Liberal National Party member for Bonney in the Queensland Legislative Assembly since 2017.

References

1991 births
Living people
Members of the Queensland Legislative Assembly
Liberal National Party of Queensland politicians
21st-century Australian politicians